Ictalurus australis, the Panuco catfish, is a species of North American freshwater catfish, endemic to the Panuco River basin in Mexico.

References
 

Ictalurus
Fish of Central America
Freshwater fish of Mexico
Fish described in 1904
Taxonomy articles created by Polbot